Still's disease can refer to:

 Systemic-onset juvenile idiopathic arthritis
 Adult-onset Still's disease

Connective tissue diseases

pl:Choroba Stilla